V. S. Rishi (15 July 1913 – 15 July 2007) was an Indian social worker and the founder Secretary of Abhaya Nilayam.

Rishi died on 15 July 2007, on his 94th birthday.

References

1913 births
2007 deaths
Indian social workers